Leily Nahary (in Arabic : ليلي نهاري) (often varied as Leily Nhary, Lealy Nahary) is Amr Diab's album released in the summer of 2004.

The album contains 10 tracks, with one video clip for "Lealy Nahary", which was directed by Cameron Casey. The album was 2004's biggest release in Egypt and many Arab countries, and marked the first album that Amr Diab recorded with Rotana after leaving Alam El Phan in 2003.

Track listing
Lealy Nahary - 4:04 - My Day and Night
Wahashtiny - 3:55 - Missed me
Tinsa Wahda - 4:22 - To Forget One
Khad Alby Ma'ah - 4:01 - Took My Heart With Them
Ye Douk El Bab - 3:30 - The Door Knocks
Dayman Fi Baly - 3:45 - Always On My Mind
Khaleena Neshofak - 3:56 - Let Us See You
Qusad Einy - 4:22 - In Front Of My Eyes
Illa Heya - 3:40 - Just Her
Rihet El Habayib - 3:14 - The Scent Of Lovers

Credits
Amr Diab - Composer, Vocals
Amr Mostafa - Composer
Mohamed Rahim - Composer
Mohamed Yehia - Composer
Ayman Bahgat Qamar - Lyricist
Bahaa El-Din Mohamed - Lyricist
Khaled Mounier - Lyricist
Nader Abdallah - Lyricist
Magdy El-Naggar - Lyricist
Nader Hamdi - Music Producer
Tarek Tawakkol - Music Producer
Yehia El-Moogy - Violins
Ahmed Abd-Elfattah - Accordion
Farouk Mohsen - Accordion
Photography - Khaled Roshdey
Rotana - Label

References

Amr Diab albums
2004 albums
Rotana Records albums
Arabic-language albums